Francisco Antonio Mosquera Valencia (born 1 April 1992) is a Colombian weightlifter, World Champion, three-time Pan American Champion and Pan American Games Champion competing in the 62 kg category until 2018 and 61 kg starting in 2018 after the International Weightlifting Federation reorganized the categories.

Career

Injury before Olympics
In 2016 he tore his Patellar tendon in his left knee 10 days before the beginning of the 2016 Summer Olympics and was unable to compete. His recovery lasted 15 months and he was unable to compete until the 2017 Bolivarian Games, during which he competed in the 62 kg division winning a gold medal.

World Championships
Mosquera won a gold medal in the 62kg division at the 2017 World Weightlifting Championships in Anaheim, this makes him the second Colombian weightlifter to win a gold medal at the World Weightlifting Championships after Leydi Solís also at the 2017 World Weightlifting Championships. He also won a silver medal in the 62kg division at the 2015 World Weightlifting Championships in Houston.

Major results

References

External links

1992 births
Living people
Colombian male weightlifters
World Weightlifting Championships medalists
Pan American Games medalists in weightlifting
Pan American Games gold medalists for Colombia
Pan American Games silver medalists for Colombia
Weightlifters at the 2011 Pan American Games
Weightlifters at the 2015 Pan American Games
Weightlifters at the 2019 Pan American Games
Medalists at the 2015 Pan American Games
Medalists at the 2019 Pan American Games
Pan American Weightlifting Championships medalists
South American Games gold medalists for Colombia
South American Games medalists in weightlifting
Competitors at the 2022 South American Games
21st-century Colombian people